Zipera is a Polish hip hop group connected with WWO and Fundacja in a larger crew called ZIP Skład.

Discography

References

Polish hip hop groups